Jean-Odéo Demars, born in Sézanne (France), 2 February 1695, died in Paris, 7 November 1756, was an 18th-century French organist, composer and harpsichordist.

In 1726, he became organist at the Saint-Jacques-la-Boucherie church in Paris. Later, he is appointed organist at Saint-Nicolas-du-Chardonnet church.

He married Geneviève Françoise Legris on February 18, 1734, and they raised seven children. He was the father of musician Hélène-Louise Demars.

As composer he wrote several spiritual songs for the female students of the Saint-Cyr school, near Paris. Fétis wrote that he published an organ book now lost.

We know little else than he was the elder brother of Charles Demars (28 May 1702 - 4 Mars 1774), nicknamed « le cadet », who became in 1728 organist in the Vannes Cathedral, in Brittany, until his death.

In 1735, Charles Demars publishes his 1er Livre de Clavecin. This book contains 4 suites in the Handel manner.

This collection consists of four suites:
 Suite I in A major
 Suite II in G minor
 Suite III in D minor
 Suite IV in C minor

See also 
 List of French harpsichordists
 List of composers from Brittany

References

External links 
 IMSLP Charles Demars : Pièces de Clavecin
Two pieces by Charles Demars played by harpsichordist Claude Nadeau :
 Prélude
 Gigue
 Demars (de Mars), Jean Odéo (Odo) on Grove Music Online
 Charles Demars - Allemande from Suite in A Major on YouTube

1695 births
1756 deaths
French classical organists
French male organists
French harpsichordists
French Baroque composers
French music educators
Place of birth missing
17th-century male musicians
Male classical organists